General elections were held in Jordan on 16 October 1954, the first that political parties were allowed to contest. The result was a victory for independent candidates, which won 38 of the 40 seats, with the other two going to the Liberal Party and the Umma Party.

Results

References

Elections in Jordan
General election
Jordan
Election and referendum articles with incomplete results
Jordan